Frederikssund station is the terminus of the Frederikssund radial of the S-train network of Copenhagen, Denmark. It is located near the center of the city of Frederikssund. The station area includes a large bus terminal from which a network of bus lines service the rural areas in Hornsherred and those north of the urban corridor between Frederikssund and Copenhagen.

History
The original terminus of the railway from Copenhagen to Frederikssund, which opened in 1879, was located approximately where the current station is. In 1928 the central Zealand railway opened between Hvalsø and Frederikssund, and the station was moved about 500 m south such that the tracks could continue onto a bridge across Roskilde Fjord, the remains of which are still conspicuous. It was planned to extend the central Zealand railway eastwards towards Slangerup and Hillerød, but the project was abandoned and the railway to Hvalsø was closed again in 1936.

The station kept its new, somewhat remote, location for more than 50 years after this, even though the main bus terminal of Frederikssund remained at the original station's location, making transfers cumbersome. The area of the original station remained railway property, being used for freight, but only in 1989, when the railway was converted to S-train service, did the passenger service return to a new station complex at the original location.

Vinge station just south of Frederikssund opened 14 December 2020. It is served by the C line.

Services

See also
 List of railway stations in Denmark

References

S-train (Copenhagen) stations
Railway stations opened in 1989
1989 establishments in Denmark
Buildings and structures in Frederikssund Municipality
Railway stations in Denmark opened in the 20th century